The Estadio La Cueva del León is a multi-use stadium located in Huixquilucan, State of Mexico.  It is currently used mostly for American football matches and is the home stadium of Leones Anáhuac Norte that plays at the ONEFA. The stadium has a capacity of 5,000 people.

References

External links

Sports venues in the State of Mexico
La Cueva del León
Athletics (track and field) venues in Mexico
College American football venues in Mexico